Gavmishabad may refer to:
 Gavmishabad, Ahvaz
 Gavmishabad, Dezful
 Gavmishabad-e Sharqi, Dezful County
 Gavmishabad, Shushtar